Liet may refer to

 Liet-Kynes, planetologist of Arrakis in the Dune universe
 LIET, Lords Institute of Engineering & Technology
 Liet-Lavlut, Pan-European Song Contest for Minority Languages
 Liet Unlimited, Clothing production and design.